Ñawpallaqta or Ñawpa Llaqta (Quechua  ñawpa ancient, llaqta place (village, town, city, country, nation), "ancient place", also spelled Naupallacta, Ñaupa Llacta, Ñaupa Llaqta, Ñaupallacta, Ñaupallaqta, Nawpallacta) may refer to:

 Ñawpallaqta, Huanca Sancos, an archaeological site in the Huanca Sancos Province, Ayacucho Region, Peru
 Ñawpallaqta, Fajardo, an archaeological site in the Fajardo Province, Ayacucho Region, Peru
 Ñawpallaqta, Lucanas, an archaeological site on top of a mountain of that name in the Lucanas Province, Ayacucho Region, Peru